3225 Hoag, provisional designation , is a dynamical Hungaria asteroid from the innermost regions of the asteroid belt, approximately  in diameter. It was discovered on 20 August 1982, by American astronomer couple Carolyn and Eugene Shoemaker at the Palomar Observatory in California. The stony S/L-type asteroid has a short rotation period of 2.37 hours. It was named for American astronomer Arthur Hoag.

Orbit and classification 

Hoag is a member of the dynamical Hungaria group, that forms the innermost dense concentration of asteroids in the Solar System. However, it is not a member of the Hungaria family, located within the dynamical group, but an asteroid of the background population.

It orbits the Sun in the innermost asteroid belt at a distance of 1.8–2.0 AU once every 2 years and 7 months (941 days; semi-major axis of 1.88 AU). Its orbit has an eccentricity of 0.05 and an inclination of 25° with respect to the ecliptic.

Physical characteristics 

The Small Solar System Objects Spectroscopic Survey (S3OS2) characterized Hoag as a stony S-type and uncommon L-type asteroid in the Tholen- and SMASS-like taxonomy, respectively.

Rotation period and poles 
Several rotational lightcurves of Hoag have been obtained from photometric observations since 2007. Best-rated lightcurve by American astronomer Brian Warner at his Palmer Divide Observatory in Colorado, gave a well-defined rotation period of 2.3717 hours with a brightness amplitude of 0.12 magnitude.

In 2010, Warner also modeled a lightcurve using the data from his various photometric observations. It gave a concurring sidereal period of 2.37219 hours, as well as two spin axes at (45.0°, 45.0°) and (225.0°, 45.0°) in ecliptic coordinates (λ, β).

Diameter and albedo 

According to the survey carried out by the NEOWISE mission of NASA's Wide-field Infrared Survey Explorer, Hoag measures between 5.06 and 6.24 kilometers in diameter and its surface has an albedo between 0.28 and 0.32. The Collaborative Asteroid Lightcurve Link assumes an albedo of 0.3 – a compromise figure between a stony (0.20) and an E-type (0.40) Hungarian asteroid – and calculates a diameter of 5.56 kilometers based on an absolute magnitude of 13.2.

Naming 

This minor planet was named after American astronomer Arthur Hoag (1921–1999), a former director of the Lowell Observatory, known for his photometric research, the development of astronomical sites and instruments, and investigations of quasars. In 1950, he discovered a type of ring galaxy known as Hoag's Object. The official naming citation was published by the Minor Planet Center on 27 December 1985.

Notes

References

External links 
 Asteroid Lightcurve Database (LCDB), query form (info )
 Dictionary of Minor Planet Names, Google books
 Asteroids and comets rotation curves, CdR – Observatoire de Genève, Raoul Behrend
 Discovery Circumstances: Numbered Minor Planets (1)-(5000) – Minor Planet Center
 
 

003225
003225
Discoveries by Eugene Merle Shoemaker
Discoveries by Carolyn S. Shoemaker
Named minor planets
19820820